Ahmadabad-e Yek (also Romanized as Aḩmadābād-e Yek; also known as Aḩmadābād) is a village in Kavirat Rural District, Chatrud District, Kerman County, Kerman Province, Iran. At the 2006 census, its population was 20, in 5 families.

References 

Populated places in Kerman County